Udinese Channel is a subscription-based channel, entirely dedicated to the Italian football team Udinese Calcio.  The channel offers Udinese Calcio fans exclusive interviews with players and staff, full matches, including replays of all Serie A, Coppa Italia, and UEFA Cup games, in addition to vintage matches, footballing news, and other themed programming.

Staff
Francesco Pezzella
Chiara Perale
Gabriele Schiavi
Maurizio Ferrari
Luca Brivio
Giulia Borletto
Valerio Canetti
Michele Criscitiello

Regular or semi-regular guests
Bruno Pizzul
Ivan Zazzaroni
Giancarlo Padovan
Malu Mpasinkatu  
Riccardo Guffanti
Massimiliano Caniato
Xavier Jacobelli

Programming
Udinese Network 
Rassegna stampa
Buongiorno Friuli
Udinese news
Udinese tonight
A tu per tu con ...
Udinese time
Orizzonti bianconeri
TG 6 minuti
Sintesi campionato
Diario della settimana
Lo sai che?
Speciale vecchie glorie bianconere
Speciale Watford
Speciale Granada

Coverage Map

110  Friuli-Venezia Giulia
195  Veneto

Multiplex

See also
Udinese Calcio
Udine

References
http://messaggeroveneto.gelocal.it/cronaca/2012/10/23/news/non-soltanto-calcio-udinese-channel-amplia-i-programmi-1.5909253
http://www.digital-forum.it/showthread.php?t=138454

External links
Udinese Channel Streaming
Youtube Channel

Television channels in Italy
Sports television in Italy
Television channels and stations established in 2011
2011 establishments in Italy
Italian-language television stations
Mass media in Udine